Stella í orlofi is a 1986 Icelandic comedy film directed by Þórhildur Þorleifsdóttir and written by Guðný Halldórsdóttir. It has enjoyed enduring popularity in Iceland, and was followed up with the sequel Stella í framboði in 2002.

References

External links
 

1986 films
Icelandic comedy films
1980s Icelandic-language films
1986 comedy films